
Year 116 BC was a year of the pre-Julian Roman calendar. At the time it was known as the Year of the Consulship of Geta and Eburnus (or, less frequently, year 638 Ab urbe condita) and the First Year of Yuanding. The denomination 116 BC for this year has been used since the early medieval period, when the Anno Domini calendar era became the prevalent method in Europe for naming years.

Events 
 By place 

 Egypt 
 June 26 – At the death of Ptolemy VIII Physcon, Cleopatra III has chosen her younger son Ptolemy X Alexander as co-regent, but the Alexandrians forced her to bring Ptolemy IX from Cyprus, of which he is governor.
 Ptolemy IX Philometor Soter II Lathyros becomes king of Egypt and claims the throne.

Births 
 Marcus Terentius Varro, Roman scholar and writer (d. 27 BC)

Deaths 
 June 26 – Ptolemy VIII Physcon, king (pharaoh) of Egypt (b. c. 182 BC)
 Cleopatra II, queen of Egypt (b. c. 185 BC)
 Zhang Tang, Chinese official and politician

References